1977 general election may refer to:

 1977 Australian federal election
 1977 Danish general election
 1977 Dutch general election
 March 1977 Fijian general election
 September 1977 Fijian general election
 1977 Greek legislative election
 1977 Indian general election
 1977 Irish general election
 1977 Israeli legislative election
 1977 Northern Territory general election
 1977 Norwegian parliamentary election
 1977 Queensland state election
 1977 Rhodesian general election
 1977 Spanish general election
 1977 Western Australian state election